Princess Suheung (died after 1277) was a Goryeo Royal Princess as the only daughter of King Gojong and the younger sister of King Wonjong and King Yeongjong. Through her mother, King Huijong was her maternal grandfather. She later married Wang Jeon (왕전) and had two sons, but he then died in 1256 and was honoured as Duke Sinyang (신양공). Although her death date was unknown, but according to Choe Se-yeon (최세연)'s records, she was presumed to died after her grandnephew, Wang Jang appointed as the Crown Prince in 1277.

References

Year of birth unknown
Year of death unknown
Goryeo princesses
13th-century Korean women